The following is a list of Singaporean electoral divisions from 1955 to 1959 that served as constituencies that elected members to the 1st Legislative Assembly of Singapore in the 1955 Singaporean general elections. The number of seats had increased to 25 from 9 since the previous election in 1951.

Constituencies

References

External links 
 

1955